John Buxton may refer to:

John Buxton (politician) (1608–1660), English lawyer and politician
Sir John Buxton, 2nd Baronet (1788–1842), English politician
John Buxton (rugby union) (1933–2007), a New Zealand international rugby union representative
John Buxton (ornithologist) (1912–1989), scholar, university teacher, poet and ornithologist

See also

Buxton (surname)